Matt Alan Veach (born May 31, 1981) is a retired American mixed martial arts fighter who most recently competed in the Welterweight division. A professional competitor since 2006, he has competed for the UFC, BAMMA, the MFC, and Cage Warriors.

Background
Born and raised in Illinois, Veach started wrestling in the sixth grade and competed for 12 years. He was a high school state placer, Junior College All-American, and a D-1 NCAA qualifier for Eastern Illinois University.

Mixed martial arts career

Ultimate Fighting Championship
Veach made his UFC debut at UFC Fight Night: Lauzon vs. Stephens, facing off against UFC veteran, Matt Grice. After getting knocked down in a brief exchange early in the first round, Veach quickly recovered and dropped Grice, following up with punches on the ground as the referee halted the bout at 4:34 of the very first round, giving Matt the win via TKO.

At The Ultimate Fighter: Heavyweights Finale in a fight against Frank Edgar as a replacement for an injured Kurt Pellegrino, Veach made his second appearance in the UFC. The first round was very close; Edgar controlled most of the standup part of the round, while Veach landed numerous takedowns and slams. However, early in the second round, Edgar caught Veach with an over hand right that stunned him, leaving him open for Edgar to take him to the ground, achieve the back mounted position and sink in a rear naked choke for the win at 2:22 of round two. This marked the first loss of Veach's professional mixed martial arts career.

Veach faced Paul Kelly at UFC 112, losing via second round submission. The loss was his second straight getting him released from his UFC contract.

Post UFC
After being released from the UFC, Veach continued to train with Matt Hughes and Robbie Lawler at The HIT Squad. He won 4 straight fights in different promotions following his UFC release.

Maximum Fighting Championships
In February 2011, Veach signed with the Canadian promotion, MFC. His debut came at the main card of MFC 28 against Drew Fickett. Veach took the fight with only five days notice, stepping in for the MFC lightweight champion, Antonio McKee.  He lost the fight via submission in the first round.

BAMMA
Veach faced off against 'Judo' Jim Wallhead in the main event of BAMMA 12 in Newcastle, England on March 9, 2013. He lost the fight via submission in the first round.

Mixed martial arts record

|-
| Win
| align=center| 17–5
| Steven Mann
| Submission (armbar)
| Shamrock FC 279
| 
| align=center| 3
| align=center| 2:10
| St. Louis, Missouri, United States
| 
|-
| Loss
| align=center| 16–5
| Jim Wallhead
| Submission (rear-naked choke)
| BAMMA 12
| 
| align=center| 1
| align=center| 3:05
| Newcastle upon Tyne, Tyne and Wear, North East England
| 
|-
| Win
| align=center| 16–4
| Zac Kelley
| TKO (punches)
| C3 Fights: Rumble at Red Rock
| 
| align=center| 1
| align=center| 4:58
| Oklahoma, United States
| 
|-
| Loss
| align=center| 15–4
| Eric Wisely
| Submission (armbar)
| Gladiator Cage Fights: Knockout Night 1
| 
| align=center| 2
| align=center| 2:49
| Marion, Illinois, United States
| 
|-
| Loss
| align=center| 15–3
| Drew Fickett
| Submission (armbar)
| MFC 28: Supremacy
| 
| align=center| 1
| align=center| 0:36
| Edmonton, Alberta, Canada
| Catchweight (160 lbs) bout.
|-
| Win
| align=center| 15–2
| Donavon Winters
| Decision (split)
| Capital City Cage Wars 6
| 
| align=center| 3
| align=center| 5:00
| Springfield, United States
| 
|-
| Win
| align=center| 14–2
| Kenneth Rosfort-Nees
| Decision (unanimous)
| Cage Warriors 38: Young Guns
| 
| align=center| 5
| align=center| 5:00
| London, England
| 
|-
| Win
| align=center| 13–2
| McKenzie Jackson
| Submission (arm-triangle choke)
| Mainstream MMA: Swing Back
| 
| align=center| 1
| align=center| 1:26
| Cedar Rapids, United States
| 
|-
| Win
| align=center| 12–2
| Kalel Robinson
| Decision (unanimous)
| 28 Productions
| 
| align=center| 3
| align=center| 5:00
| St. Louis, United States
| 
|-
| Loss
| align=center| 11–2
| Paul Kelly
| Submission (guillotine choke)
| UFC 112
| 
| align=center| 2
| align=center| 3:41
| Abu Dhabi, United Arab Emirates
|Welterweight bout.
|-
| Loss
| align=center| 11–1
| Frankie Edgar
| Submission (rear-naked choke)
| The Ultimate Fighter: Heavyweights Finale
| 
| align=center| 2
| align=center| 2:22
| Las Vegas, United States
| 
|-
| Win
| align=center| 11–0
| Matt Grice
| TKO (punches)
| UFC Fight Night: Lauzon vs. Stephens
| 
| align=center| 1
| align=center| 4:34
| Tampa, United States
| 
|-
| Win
| align=center| 10–0
| Alex Carter
| Submission (rear-naked choke)
| Capital City Cage Wars
| 
| align=center| 1
| align=center| 1:05
| Springfield, United States
| 
|-
| Win
| align=center| 9–0
| Diego Brandão
| TKO (injury)
| Pro Battle MMA: Immediate Impact
| 
| align=center| 2
| align=center| 1:28
| Springdale, United States
| 
|-
| Win
| align=center| 8–0
| Brent Mehrhoff
| Submission (rear-naked choke)
| XFO 25: Outdoor War 4
| 
| align=center| 2
| align=center| 2:22
| Island Lake, United States
| 
|-
| Win
| align=center| 7–0
| Matt MacGrath
| Decision (unanimous)
| MFC 16: Anger Management
| 
| align=center| 3
| align=center| 5:00
| Edmonton, Alberta, Canada
| 
|-
| Win
| align=center| 6–0
| Edgar Wade
| Submission (rear-naked choke)
| Iowa Challenge 44
| 
| align=center| 1
| align=center| 1:01
| Keokuk, United States
| 
|-
| Win
| align=center| 5–0
| Marcus Hermann
| Submission (triangle choke)
| Iowa Challenge 42
| 
| align=center| 1
| align=center| 0:57
| Waterloo, United States
| 
|-
| Win
| align=center| 4–0
| Jason West
| TKO (punches)
| Extreme Challenge 82
| 
| align=center| 1
| align=center| 3:24
| Springfield, United States
| 
|-
| Win
| align=center| 3–0
| Charles Wilson
| Submission (rear-naked choke)
| Pure Force 4
| 
| align=center| 1
| align=center| 4:36
| Tinley Park, United States
| 
|-
| Win
| align=center| 2–0
| Adam Therriault
| Submission (punches)
| Shootfighting Challenge
| 
| align=center| 1
| align=center| 2:35
| Lincoln, United States
| 
|-
| Win
| align=center| 1–0
| John Chester
| TKO
| Supreme Fighting Challenge
| 
| align=center| 2
| align=center| N/A
| Belleville, United States
|

References

External links
 
 

American male mixed martial artists
Mixed martial artists utilizing collegiate wrestling
Living people
1981 births
People from Granite City, Illinois
People from Springfield, Illinois
Ultimate Fighting Championship male fighters
American male sport wrestlers
Amateur wrestlers